Donaldson, Moir and Paterson, also known as DMP are a Scottish rock group originally formed in 1985 as White (Fear of God from Honey at the Core).  Since 1998, as DMP they have released a number of albums.

Since February 2008, DMP have hosted a popular podcast - DMPmusic podcast series - on iTunes and jellycast.

Personnel
George Paterson - Lead vocals (1985–present)
Gordon Moir - Lead guitar (1985–present)
William 'Billy' Donaldson - Bass (1985–1998)

Discography
Eight Up and Passed Out  Compilation of early work released 1998
D'ya Get It? released 1998 (Poco Alto)
It's About Time released 1999 (Poco Alto)
Natural Anthems released 2000 (Poco Alto)
St Jude and the Wilderness Years released 2003 (Poco Alto)
Au released August 2010 (Poco Alto)

References

External links
 Official website
 1980s Glasgow bands site
 BBC feature
 Jellycast podcast site

Scottish rock music groups
Musical groups from Glasgow